Everywhere is an album by the Gerald Wilson Orchestra recorded in late 1967 and early 1968 and released on the Pacific Jazz label.

Reception

AllMusic rated the album with 3 stars; in his review, Scott Yanow noted: "None of the individual tunes or performances on this out of print set caught on (nor would any make it into Wilson's greatest-hits collections), but the overall music is pleasing and swinging".

Track listing 
All compositions by Gerald Wilson except as indicated
 "Everywhere" - 4:19
 "Out of This World"  (Harold Arlen, Johnny Mercer) - 5:36
 "Pretty Polly" (Michel Legrand, Don Black) - 2:30
 "M. Capetillo" - 2:42
 "Little Bit of Soul" - 3:50
 "Do I Love You" (Richard Rodgers, Oscar Hammerstein II) - 2:53
 "Del Olivar" - 4:53	
 "Mini Waltz" - 4:47
Recorded at Liberty Studios in Hollywood, CA on December 4, 1967 (tracks 1, 4, 5 & 7) and January 2, 1968 (tracks 2, 3, 6 & 8).

Personnel 
Gerald Wilson - arranger, conductor
Gary Barone (tracks 2, 3, 6 & 8), Bobby Bryant (tracks 2, 3, 6 & 8), Dick Forrest, Steve Huffsteter (tracks 1, 4, 5 & 7), Bill Mattison (tracks 1, 4, 5 & 7), Alex Rodriguez - trumpet
Thurman Green, Lester Robertson, Frank Strong - trombone
Mike Wimberly - bass trombone
William Green - flute, piccolo
Ramon Bojorquez, Henry DeVega (tracks 2, 3, 6 & 8) - alto saxophone
Anthony Ortega - alto saxophone, flute, alto flute
Hadley Caliman, Harold Land - tenor saxophone
Richard Aplanalp - baritone saxophone
Bobby Hutcherson - vibraphone
Jack Wilson - piano, organ
Joe Pass - guitar
Stanley Gilbert (tracks 2, 3, 6 & 8), Buddy Woodson (tracks 1, 4, 5 & 7) - bass
Frank Butler (tracks 2, 3, 6 & 8), Carl Lott (tracks 1, 4, 5 & 7) - drums
Moises Obligacion - congas (tracks 1, 4, 5 & 7)
Hugh Anderson - percussion

References 

Gerald Wilson albums
1968 albums
Pacific Jazz Records albums
Albums arranged by Gerald Wilson
Albums conducted by Gerald Wilson